Píriz or Piriz is a surname. People with that name include:

 Conduelo Píriz (1905-1976), Uruguayan footballer
 Emily Piriz (born 1996), American singer
 Facundo Píriz (born 1990), Uruguayan footballer
 Jonathan Píriz (born 1986), Uruguayan footballer
 José María Piriz (born 1943), Uruguayan footballer
 Juan Píriz (1902-1946), Uruguayan footballer
 Sebastián Píriz (born 1990), Uruguayan footballer
 Víctor Píriz (born 1980), Uruguayan footballer

See also